The ATP Challenger Tour is the secondary professional tennis circuit organized by the Association of Tennis Professionals (ATP). The 2013 ATP Challenger Tour calendar comprised 149 tournaments, with prize money ranging from $35,000 up to $220,000.

Schedule

January

February

March

April

May

June

July

August

September

October

November

Statistical information 
These tables present the number of singles (S) and doubles (D) titles won by each player and each nation during the season. The players/nations are sorted by: 1) total number of titles (a doubles title won by two players representing the same nation counts as only one win for the nation); 2) a singles > doubles hierarchy; 3) alphabetical order (by family names for players).

To avoid confusion and double counting, these tables should be updated only after an event is completed.

As of 18 November 2013

Titles won by player

Titles won by nation

Year-to-date Challenger rankings

Point distribution 
Points are awarded as follows:

See also 
 International Tennis Federation

References

External links 
 
 

 
ATP Challenger Tour
ATP Challenger Tour